Meydar may refer to:
 Meydar-e Olya